Alexis Martin may refer to:

 Alexis Martin (gymnast) (born 1994), French acrobatic gymnast
 Alexis Martin (actor) (born 1964), Canadian actor and writer
 Alexis Martín Arias (born 1992), Argentine footballer

See also
 Alexis St. Martin (1802–1880), Canadian voyageur